The Greater Western Victoria Rebels is an Australian rules football club which plays in the NAB League, the statewide under-18s competition in Victoria, Australia.

Initially known as the Ballarat Rebels and wearing green and gold, the team was established in 1993 as one of four regional under-18s clubs, set up as part of a plan by the AFL Commission to have clubs set in all regions of the state of Victoria. The club became affiliated with the new VFL's North Ballarat Football Club in 1996, and changed its name to North Ballarat Rebels and its colours to black and white to reflect this. In January 2017, the club again changed its name to Greater Western Victoria Rebels to reflect their expanded recruitment zone.

This was to help aid in player development and the process of the AFL draft, which allows U18 players the opportunity to be selected by AFL clubs.

Greater Western Victoria has produced many notable AFL players including Adam Goodes, Drew Petrie, Troy Chaplin, Jed Adcock, Tim Notting, Shannon Watt, James Walker and Shane O'Bree.

Honours
Premierships (1): 1997
Runners-up (0): Nil
Wooden Spoons (1): 2013

Draftees
1994:  Brad Cassidy, Mark Orchard, Tony Bourke, Ross Funcke, Gerard Jess
1996:  Brent Tuckey, Tim Notting
1997:  James Walker, Shane O'Bree, Shannon Watt, Adam Goodes, Marcus Picken, Sam Cranage
2000:   Drew Petrie, Jeremy Humm
2002:   Luke Brennan, Tristan Cartledge
2003:   Jed Adcock, Troy Chaplin, Adam Campbell
2004:   Matt Rosa
2005:   Stephen Owen
2006:   Nathan Brown, James Frawley, Mitchell Brown, Shaun Grigg, Tim Houlihan, Matt Tyler
2007:   Clayton Hinkley, Kyle Cheney, Matt Austin
2008:   Nick Suban, Jordan Roughead, Tim Ruffles, Will Young
2009:      David Astbury, Matthew Dea, Josh Cowan
2010:     Lucas Cook, Tom McDonald, Ben Mabon
2011:      Sebastian Ross, Rory Taggert, Tom Downie, Nick O'Brien, Brad Crouch*, Kurt Aylett+, Jeremy Cameron+
2012: Dominic Barry†, Jake Neade†, Michael Close, Tanner Smith, Martin Gleeson, Jake Lloyd
2013: Matt Crouch, Louis Herbert, Dallas Willsmore
2014: Oscar McDonald, Dan Butler, Jesse Palmer
2015: Jacob Hopper, Daniel Rioli, Darcy Tucker, Yestin Eades
2016: Hugh McCluggage, Jarrod Berry, Cedric Cox, Willem Drew, Tom Williamson, Jamaine Jones 
2017: Lloyd Meek, Flynn Appleby
2018: Tom Berry
2019: Jay Rantall
2020: Harry Sharp, Nick Stevens
2021: Josh Gibcus, Sam Butler

Notes:
* Denotes being selected in Greater Western Sydney Mini-Draft (2011)
+ Denotes player was pre-listed by Greater Western Sydney (2011)
† Denotes player was pre-listed and on-traded by Greater Western Sydney (2012)
Sources:1994-2009: AFL Record Season Guide 2010

Team of the Year
1993:   -
1994:  Shane Snibson, Brad Cassidy
1995:  Julian Field
1996:  Brent Tuckey, Shane O'Bree
1997:  James Walker, Winis Imbi
1998:  Marc Greig
1999:  Jeremy Clayton
2000:  Shane Hutchinson, Drew Petrie
2001:  Justin Perkins
2002:  Adam Fisher
2003:  Jed Adcock, Matt Sharkey
2004:  Matt Rosa
2005:  Bill Driscoll, Steve Clifton
2006:  Nathan Brown, James Frawley, Shaun Grigg, Lachlan George
2007:  Kyle Cheney, Nick Suban
2008:  Andrew Hooper, Jordan Roughead, Nick Suban
2009:  Andrew Hooper
2010:  Lucas Cook
2011: Brad Crouch, Nick O'Brien
2012: Nick Rippon, Matt Crouch, Jake Lloyd

References

External links

NAB League clubs
1993 establishments in Australia

Australian rules football clubs in Victoria (Australia)
NAB League Girls clubs
Sport in Ballarat
Australian rules football clubs established in 1993